Helicophanta souverbiana is a species of air-breathing land snail, a terrestrial pulmonate gastropods mollusk in the family Acavidae. The species occurs in Madagascar.

Subspecies 
 Helicophanta souverbiana souverbiana (Fischer, 1860)
 Helicophanta souverbiana audiberi Mousson, 1882

References

Acavidae
Gastropods described in 1860